The discography of American record producer DJ Khaled consists of twelve studio albums and 54 singles (including 11 as a featured artist).
 
On June 6, 2006, Khaled released his debut album, Listennn... the Album. The album reached number 12 on the Billboard 200.
 
On June 12, 2007, Khaled released his second studio album, We the Best. The album reached number eight on the Billboard 200. It produced the top-20 single, "I'm So Hood", which features T-Pain, Trick Daddy, Rick Ross, and Plies, and reached number 19 on the Billboard Hot 100. It also produced the top-40 single, "We Takin Over", which features Akon, T.I., Rick Ross, Fat Joe, Birdman, and Lil Wayne, and reached number 28 on the Hot 100.
 
On September 16, 2008, Khaled released his third studio album, We Global. The album reached number seven on the Billboard 200. It produced the top-40 single, "Out Here Grindin", which features Akon, Rick Ross, Young Jeezy, Lil Boosie, Trick Daddy, Ace Hood, and Plies, and reached number 38 on the Billboard Hot 100.
 
On March 2, 2010, Khaled released his fourth studio album, Victory. The album reached number 14 on the Billboard 200. It produced the top-40 single, "All I Do Is Win", which features T-Pain, Ludacris, Snoop Dogg, and Rick Ross, and reached number 24 on the Billboard Hot 100.
 
On July 19, 2011, Khaled released his fifth studio album, We the Best Forever. The album reached number five on the Billboard 200. It produced the top-10 single, "I'm on One", which features Drake, Rick Ross, and Lil Wayne, and reached number 10 on the Billboard Hot 100.
 
On August 21, 2012, Khaled released his sixth studio album, Kiss the Ring. The album reached number four on the Billboard 200.
 
On October 22, 2013, Khaled released his seventh studio album, Suffering from Success. The album reached number seven on the Billboard 200. It produced the top-40 single, "No New Friends", which features Drake, Rick Ross, and Lil Wayne, and reached number 37 on the Billboard Hot 100.
 
On October 23, 2015, Khaled released his eighth studio album, I Changed a Lot. The album reached number 12 on the Billboard 200. It produced the top-40 single, "Hold You Down", which features Chris Brown, August Alsina, Future, and Jeremih, and reached number 39 on the Billboard Hot 100.
 
On July 29, 2016, Khaled released his ninth studio album, Major Key. The album debuted and peaked atop the Billboard 200, giving him his first chart-topping project. It produced the top-20 single, "For Free", which features Drake and reached number 13 on the Billboard Hot 100. It also produced the top-40 singles, "I Got the Keys", which features Jay-Z and Future, and "Do You Mind", which features Nicki Minaj, Chris Brown, August Alsina, Jeremih, Future, and Rick Ross; the songs reached numbers 30 and 27 on the Hot 100, respectively.
 
On June 23, 2017, Khaled released his tenth studio album, Grateful. The album debuted and peaked atop the Billboard 200, giving him his second chart-topping project. It produced the Billboard Hot 100 number-one single, "I'm the One", which features Justin Bieber, Quavo, Chance the Rapper, and Lil Wayne. It also produced the top-10 single, "Wild Thoughts", which features Rihanna and Bryson Tiller, and reached number two on the Hot 100.
 
On May 17, 2019, Khaled released his eleventh studio album, Father of Asahd. The album debuted and peaked at number two on the Billboard 200. It produced the top-10 single, "No Brainer" from 2018, which features Justin Bieber, Chance the Rapper, and Quavo, and debuted and peaked at number five on the Billboard Hot 100. It also produced the top-20 single, "Wish Wish", which features Cardi B and 21 Savage, which reached number 19 on the Hot 100. The album also contains the top-40 singles, "Top Off" from 2018, which features Jay-Z, Future, and Beyoncé, and "Higher", which features Nipsey Hussle and John Legend; the songs reached numbers 22 and 21 on the Hot 100, respectively.
 
On April 30, 2021, Khaled released his self-titled twelfth studio album, Khaled Khaled, which is named after his legal name. The album debuted and peaked atop the Billboard 200, giving him his third chart-topping project. It produced the top-10 singles, "Popstar" and "Greece", both of which feature Drake and were released in 2020; the songs debuted and peaked at numbers three and eight on the Billboard Hot 100, respectively. It also produced the top-20 single, "Every Chance I Get", which features Lil Baby and Lil Durk, and debuted and peaked at number 20 on the Hot 100. The album also contains the top-40 single, "Sorry Not Sorry", which features Nas, Jay-Z, and James Fauntleroy, and debuted and peaked at number 30 on the Hot 100.

On August 26, 2022, Khaled released his thirteenth studio album, God Did. It produced the top-10 single, "Staying Alive", which features frequent collaborators Drake and Lil Baby.

Studio albums

Singles

As lead artist

As featured artist

Promotional singles

Other charted songs

Guest appearances

Music videos

As lead artist

As featured artist

Production discography

Notes

References

Hip hop discographies
Discographies of American artists